The 1970 Pacific Southwest Open – Men's doubles was an event of the 1970 Pacific Southwest Open tennis tournament and was played on outdoor hard courts at the Los Angeles Tennis Center in Los Angeles, California in the United States between September 21 and September 27, 1970. Pancho Gonzales and Ron Holmberg were the defending Pacific Southwest Open champions but did not compete together in this edition. Sixth-seeded team of Tom Okker and Marty Riessen won the doubles title by defeating fifth-seeded pairing Bob Lutz and Stan Smith in the final 7–6, 6–2.

Seeds

Draw

Finals

Top half

Bottom half

References

External links
 ITF tournament edition details

Los Angeles Open (tennis)
Pacific Southwest Open
Pacific Southwest Open